Cadley is an unincorporated community in Warren County, Georgia, United States.

References 

Unincorporated communities in Warren County, Georgia
Unincorporated communities in Georgia (U.S. state)